Calvin High School may refer to:

Calvin High School (Louisiana) in Calvin, Louisiana
Calvin High School (North Dakota), a now defunct school in Calvin, North Dakota
Calvin High School (Oklahoma) in Calvin, Oklahoma

Places with similar names include:
Calvin Christian High School in Grandville, Michigan